The cutlass is a type of sword. 

Cutlass may also refer to:

Military
 HMS Cutlass, several ships of the British Royal Navy
 HMS Empire Cutlass, a 1943 infantry landing ship
 USS Cutlass (SS-478), a 1944 U.S. Navy submarine, later used by the Republic of China
 Vought F7U Cutlass, US Navy carrier-based fighter-bomber aircraft in service 1951–1959
 a nickname for the U.S. Navy's Enlisted Surface Warfare Specialist pin

Other uses
 Cutlass (film), a short 2007 film directed by Kate Hudson
 Cutlass (rocket engine)
 The Cutlass, a 2017 Caribbean film
 Cutlass programming language and application system, developed by the UK's Central Electricity Generating Board
 Cessna 172RG Cutlass, a light, civilian, single-engined aircraft
 Frankie Cutlass (born 1971), American rapper and music producer
 Oldsmobile Cutlass, an automobile line
 A term for the machete in the English-speaking Caribbean

See also
 
 Cutlassfish, a family of tropical fish
 Kutless, a band